Dyos is an English surname. Notable people with this surname include:

 Harold James Dyos (1921–1978), British historian
 Pete Dyos (born 1980), English darts player

See also
 Dios (disambiguation)
 Dyo (disambiguation)
 Dyos is also the Filipino name for God